Yueyang County is a county in Hunan province, China. It is under the administration of Yueyang City.

The county is located on the northeastern margin of the province, the Xiang River runs through the west land of the county from south to east, the most of the county is located on the eastern shore of the Dongting Lake. It is bordered to the north by Jianli County of Hubei, Linxiang City, Yunxi and Yueyanglou Districts, to the northwest and the west by Junshan District and Nan County, to the south by Yuanjiang, Miluo Cities, Xiangyin and Pingjiang Counties, to the east by Tongcheng County of Hubei.

The county has 11 towns and three townships under its jurisdiction. The government seat is Rongjiawan.

Administrative divisions
In 2015, Yueyang had three townships and 11 towns under its jurisdiction. The township of Yanglin was reorganized as the town of Yanglinjie on November 17, 2017. The county now has two townships and 12 towns under its jurisdiction.

2 townships
 Changhu
 Zhongzhou, Yueyang

12 towns
 Baixiang, Yueyang
 Buxian
 Gangkou, Yueyang
 Gongtian
 Huangshajie
 Maotian
 Rongjiawan
 Xinkai, Yueyang
 Xinqiang
 Yanglinjie
 Yuetian
 Zhangguying

References

 
County-level divisions of Hunan
Yueyang